Barra de Guabiraba (Guabiraba Bar) is a city located in the state of Pernambuco, Brazil. It is located 132.6 km away from Recife, capital of the state of Pernambuco. The city has an estimated (Ibge 2020) population of 14,510 inhabitants.

Geography
 State - Pernambuco
 Region - Agreste Pernambucano
 Boundaries - Gravatá and Sairé (N); Bonito (S and W); Cortês (E)
 Area - 114.22 km2
 Elevation - 482 m
 Hydrography - Sirinhaém and Una rivers
 Vegetation - Subperenifólia forest
 Clima - hot and humid
 Annual average temperature - 23.0 c
 Distance to Recife - 132.6 km

Economy
The main economic activities in Barra de Guabiraba are based in industry and agribusiness, especially manioc, sugarcane, passion fruits; and livestock such as cattle and poultry.

Economic indicators

Economy by Sector
2006

Health indicators

References

Municipalities in Pernambuco